Füzesgyarmat is a town in Békés county, in the Southern Great Plain region of south-east Hungary.

History

The jewish community
A Jewish community lived in the village from the beginning of the 19th century until it was destroyed by the Nazis during the Holocaust. In 1880 there were 171 Jews in the place and by 1930 already 230 lived there. A synagogue was built in 1929 and it exists to this day and serves as a school.

Geography
It covers an area of 127.41 km2 and has a population of 5774 people (2014).

Sport
Füzesgyarmati SK, association football club

Twin towns – sister cities
Füzesgyarmat is twinned with:

  Ojdula, Romania 
  Zimandu Nou, Romania

References

External links

  in Hungarian

 
Populated places in Békés County
Jewish communities destroyed in the Holocaust